

 
Charlotte is a locality in the Northern Territory of Australia located about  south of the territorial capital of Darwin.

It consists of land within the boundaries of the cadastral unit of the Hundred of Hughes in the north and those parts of the hundreds of Finniss and Hart bounded by the Finniss River in the south.

It is named after the Charlotte River which was mapped along with the Annie River in 1869 by a survey team from the South Australian government expedition led by George Goyder.  The official source suggests that the two rivers were named after family members of persons within the survey team.  The locality’s boundaries and name were gazetted on 4 April 2007.

The Cox Peninsula Road passes throughout the top of the locality with the following roads branching off to the west and the south respectively – the Fog Bay Road and the Litchfield Park Road.  

The Kangaroo Flats Training Area, an Australian Defence Force facility, is located within the locality’s boundaries.

The 2016 Australian census which was conducted in August 2016 reports that Charlotte had 18 people living within its boundaries.

Charlotte is located within the federal division of Lingiari, the territory electoral division of Daly and within the unincorporated areas of the Northern Territory.

References
 

 Populated places in the Northern Territory
Places in the unincorporated areas of the Northern Territory